The  was a constituency that represents Shimane Prefecture in the House of Councillors in the Diet of Japan. Councillors are elected to the house by single non-transferable vote (SNTV) for six-year terms. Since the establishment of the current House of Councillors electoral system in 1947, the district has elected two Councillors, one each at elections held every three years. With its 576,297 registered voters (as of September 2015) it is the second-smallest electoral district for the house. Accordingly, a 2015 revision of the Public Officers Election Law will see the district merged with the Tottori At-large district to create the Tottori-Shimane At-large district; this change will begin to take effect at the 2016 election, at which one Councillor will be elected.

The Councillor currently representing Shimane is:
 Saburo Shimada (LDP; term ends in 2019)

Elected Councillors

Election results

References 

Districts of the House of Councillors (Japan)